In network science, a biased random walk on a graph is a time path process in which an evolving variable jumps from its current state to one of various potential new states; unlike in a pure random walk, the probabilities of the potential new states are unequal.

Biased random walks on a graph provide an approach for the structural analysis of undirected graphs in order to extract their symmetries when the network is too complex or when it is not large enough to be analyzed by statistical methods. The concept of biased random walks on a graph has attracted the attention of many researchers and data companies over the past decade especially in the transportation and social networks.

Model 
There have been written many different representations of the biased random walks on graphs based on the particular purpose of the analysis. A common representation of the mechanism for undirected graphs is as follows:

Depending on the network, the attribute  can be interpreted differently. It might be implied as the attraction of a person in a social network, it might be betweenness centrality or even it might be explained as an intrinsic characteristic of a node. In case of a fair random walk on graph  is one for all the nodes.

In case of shortest paths random walks  is the total number of the shortest paths between all pairs of nodes that pass through the node . In fact the walker prefers the nodes with higher betweenness centrality which is defined as below:

Based on the above equation, the recurrence time to a node in the biased walk is given by:

Applications
There are a variety of applications using biased random walks on graphs. Such applications include control of diffusion, advertisement of products on social networks, explaining dispersal and population redistribution of animals and micro-organisms, community detections, wireless networks, and search engines.

See also
 Betweenness centrality
 Community structure
 Kullback–Leibler divergence
 Markov chain
 Maximal entropy random walk
 Random walk closeness centrality
 Social network analysis
 Travelling salesman problem

References

External links 
 Gábor Simonyi, "Graph Entropy: A Survey". In Combinatorial Optimization (ed. W. Cook, L. Lovász, and P. Seymour). Providence, RI: Amer. Math. Soc., pp. 399–441, 1995.
  Anne-Marie Kermarrec, Erwan Le Merrer, Bruno Sericola, Gilles Trédan, "Evaluating the Quality of a Network Topology through Random Walks" in Gadi Taubenfeld (ed.) Distributed Computing

Network theory
Social networks
Social systems
Social information processing